Thomas Winthrop Streeter Sr. (July 20, 1883 – June 12, 1965) was a book collector whose collection of Americana was considered one of the most important of its kind.

Biography
He was the son of Frank Sherwin and Lilian Carpenter, and he was born in Concord, New Hampshire on July 20, 1883. He was married to Ruth Cheney on July 23, 1917, and they had the following children: Frank S. Streeter (1918–2006), Thomas W. Streeter Jr., and Lillian Streeter Chance (1927-2013).

He died in Morristown, New Jersey, on June 12, 1965, and was buried in Peterborough, New Hampshire.

References

External links
 Thomas W. Streeter Papers. Yale Collection of Western Americana. Beinecke Rare Book and Manuscript Library.

American book and manuscript collectors
1883 births
1965 deaths
People from Concord, New Hampshire
Presidents of the Bibliographical Society of America